Tomáš Smola (born 19 January 1989) is a former Czech professional footballer who played as a forward.

Early life
Smola was born in Louny.

Career
Smola signed for Baník Ostrava from SFC Opava in the summer of 2019.

References

External links
 
 
 
 Tomáš Smola - iDNES.cz (in Czech)

1989 births
Living people
People from Louny
Czech footballers
Association football forwards
Czech First League players
FK Teplice players
FK Slavoj Vyšehrad players
Bohemians 1905 players
FK Ústí nad Labem players
SFC Opava players
FC Baník Ostrava players
Liga I players
CS Gaz Metan Mediaș players
Czech expatriate footballers
Czech expatriate sportspeople in Romania
Expatriate footballers in Romania
Sportspeople from the Ústí nad Labem Region